Callioplanidae is a family of flatworms belonging to the order Polycladida.

Genera:
 Ancoratheca Prudhoe, 1982
 Asolenia Hyman, 1959
 Callioplana Stimpson, 1857
 Crassiplana Hyman, 1955
 Discostylochus Bock, 1925
 Kaburakia Bock, 1925
 Koinostylochus Faubel, 1983
 Meixneria Bock, 1913
 Munseoma Bulnes, Faubel & Park, 2005
 Neostylochus Yeri & Kaburaki, 1920
 Okakarus Holleman, 2007
 Parastylochus Bock, 1913
 Tokiphallus Faubel, 1983
 Trigonoporus Lang, 1884

References

Platyhelminthes